Mainwaringia is a genus of sea snails or freshwater snails, marine gastropod mollusks in the family Littorinidae, the winkles or periwinkles.

Species
Species within the genus Mainwaringia include:

Mainwaringia leithii (E. A. Smith, 1876) 
Mainwaringia paludomoidea Nevill 
Mainwaringia rhizophila Reid, 1986

References

External links

Littorinidae